Musgrave was an electoral district of the Legislative Assembly in the Australian state of Queensland from 1886 to 1923.

The district was initially created when the Electoral district of Townsville was split by the Additional Members Act of 1885. In 1888, Musgrave was replaced by Herbert, the name Musgrave was then assigned to a seat in the Bundaberg district.

Members for Musgrave

Election results

See also
 Electoral districts of Queensland
 Members of the Queensland Legislative Assembly by year
 :Category:Members of the Queensland Legislative Assembly by name

References

Former electoral districts of Queensland
1886 establishments in Australia
1923 disestablishments in Australia
Constituencies established in 1886
Constituencies disestablished in 1923